John Patrick Hayes II served in the California State Assembly for the 30th district and during World War I he served in the United States Army.

References

External links
 Join California profile J. P. Hayes

United States Army personnel of World War I
Republican Party members of the California State Assembly
1895 births
1964 deaths